The Speedway Grand Prix of Norway is a speedway event that was a part of the Speedway Grand Prix Series.

Winners

Most wins
 Jason Crump
 Greg Hancock
 Tony Rickardsson 1 time

References

See also

Norway
Motorsport in Norway
Grand Prix